An executive committee is a committee with executive powers.

Executive Committee may also refer to:
 Executive Committee (Oregon Country) a provisional government in what became the U.S. state of Oregon
 Executive Committee of the Communist International
 Executive Committee of the Privy Council of Northern Ireland, a government body in the United Kingdom 1922–1972
 Northern Ireland Executive, a government body in the United Kingdom
 Northern Ireland Executive (1973), under the Sunningdale Agreement
 Executive Committee Range, a mountain range in Antarctica
 EXCOMM, the Executive Committee of the National Security Council, Kennedy advisors during the 1962 Cuban Missile Crisis
 Politburo, or political bureau, the executive committee for communist parties
 Provisional Committee of the State Duma, which declared itself the governing body of the Russian Empire in March 1917

See also 
 Executive (government)
 Central Executive Committee (disambiguation)
 National Executive Committee (disambiguation)
 :Category:Executive committees of political parties
 Central committee